Plínio Marcos da Silva (born 31 August 1984), simply known as Plínio, is a Brazilian footballer who plays for Uberlândia as a defender.

Career statistics

References

External links

1984 births
Living people
Brazilian footballers
Association football defenders
Campeonato Brasileiro Série B players
Campeonato Brasileiro Série C players
Campeonato Brasileiro Série D players
Sociedade Esportiva Matsubara players
Grêmio Esportivo Juventus players
Esporte Clube Novo Hamburgo players
Clube de Regatas Brasil players
Guarani FC players
América Futebol Clube (RN) players
Agremiação Sportiva Arapiraquense players
Fortaleza Esporte Clube players
Associação Atlética Anapolina players
Associação Atlética Caldense players
Goiânia Esporte Clube players
Clube Náutico Marcílio Dias players
Sampaio Corrêa Futebol Clube players
Botafogo Futebol Clube (PB) players
Botafogo Futebol Clube (SP) players